Norton Lilly International, was founded as Norton Lilly & Company in 1841 in New York City by John Norton Jr., In 1834, John Norton, Jr. moved to New York in 1834, he was born in Eastport, Maine in 1816. John Norton, Jr. John Norton, Jr. shipping experience started in 1840 when he became a partner in 
Russell & Norton, a shipping agency for with routes from Florida to the West India.  The ship operated our of Apalachicola, Florida and in 1851 added an Australia route to the line. In 1854 John Norton Jr., and his son, Edward N. Norton, opened his own shipping agency, Norton & Company and became the manager of the sailing ship Sea Flower , which operated out of Pensacola, Florida. Norton and son expanded and added a South America route with packet sailing ships.  John Norton Jr. second son Augustus Norton joined the firm in 1878. Augustus Norton died on October 17, 1889, and a year later John Norton Jr. died on October 30, 1890. Edward N. Norton continued to run Russell & Norton, but in 1907, add a partner Joseph Thomas Lilly. With the new partnership, the firm was renamed Norton Lilly & Company.

Norton Lilly & Company supported both the World War I and World War II efforts.

Norton Lilly International
Norton Lilly & Company partnered with other companies in 2002. Norton Lilly & Company partnership is with Strachan Shipping Agency, Nortec Canada and Norton Lilly Panama and Ker Norton Marine. Norton Lilly International operates logistics, for dry bulk shipping, tanker (gas and oil), reefer ships, container ships, and passenger liners to over 70 ports worldwide.

Norton Lilly International has offices in:
USA:
Baltimore, Boston, Brunswick, Charleston, Jacksonville, Jacksonville, Miami, New York - New Jersey (Port Elizabeth), Norfolk, Philadelphia, Port Canaveral, Providence, RI, Savannah, Wilmington, DE, Wilmington, NC, Beaumont, Brownsville, Corpus Christi, Cut Off, LA, Freeport, Houston, Lake Charles, Mobile, New Orleans, Saint Rose, Tampa, Long Beach - Los Angeles, Port Hueneme, Portland, San Diego, San Francisco - Oakland, Seattle, Stockton, and Tacoma.
Canada:
Montreal, Stephenville, Halifax, and Vancouver
Caribbean:
 San Juan, Panama City/Balboa, Bridgetown, St. Croix, Trinidad,
Mexico:
Mexico City, Veracruz, Altamira / Tampico, Coatzacoalcos (Pajaritos Terminal), Tuxpan, Mazanillo, Lazaro Cardenas, Ensenada / Rosarito, Progreso, and Altamaritima,
Pacific:
Guam, Saipan, and Honolulu.
Panama:
Panama City - Balboa, and Cristobal

Norton Lilly Management Corp. - World War II

Norton Lilly & Company fleet of ships that were used to help the World War II effort. During World War II Norton Lilly & Company's Norton Lilly Management Corp.  operated Merchant navy ships for the United States Shipping Board. During World War II Norton Lilly & Company was active with charter shipping with the Maritime Commission and War Shipping Administration. Norton Lilly & Company operated Liberty ships for the merchant navy. The ship was run by its Norton Lilly & Company crew and the US Navy supplied United States Navy Armed Guards to man the deck guns and radio.

World War II Ships

Liberty ships operated:
 Nachman Syrkin  
 Laurence J. Gallagher  
 SS Harold Dossett  
 Henry Bergh  31.5.44 Ashore in fog Farallon Island, Calif. Broke in two - total loss.
 SS Donald W. Bain
 SS Melville E. Stone  on Nov. 24, 1943 was torpedoed and sunk by U-516 south of Panama  
 John Colter  
 Thomas Condon  
 William H. Moody  
 Clyde Austin Dunning  
 Samdon 
Other:
 War Drake 
Post war Liberty ships:
 Joel Chandler Harris

See also

World War II United States Merchant Navy
John M. Franklin

References 

American companies established in 1841
Shipping companies of the United States
Container shipping companies of the United States
Container shipping companies